The Pirate Party is a political party in Denmark. The party is modelled on the Swedish Pirate Party. The party's chairman is Ole Husgaard.

On 28 September 2009, the party name was approved by the Danish electoral authorities.  The party's next step is to gain 20,000 supporters to allow it to contest the election.

References

External links
 Piratpartiet
 Ungpirat (Youth wing)

2009 establishments in Denmark
Denmark
Political parties in Denmark
Political parties established in 2009